The Madonna with Sleeping Child is a glue-tempera on canvas painting measuring 43 cm by 32 cm. It was painted around 1465-1470 by Andrea Mantegna and is now in the  Gemäldegalerie in Berlin.

Intended for private devotion, it dispenses with the two figures' usual haloes in favour of a more intimate, simple and tender approach. Mantegna draws on Donatello's motif of Mary's face touching the child, whilst they are both enveloped in a brocade mantle against a black background.

There is a dialogue about this painting in the novel "Lampioon küßt Mädchen und kleine Birken. Abenteuer eines Wanderers" by the German writer Manfred Hausmann de .

References

1470 paintings
Paintings of the Madonna and Child by Andrea Mantegna
Paintings in the Gemäldegalerie, Berlin